The Mekong flying barb (Esomus longimanus) is a species of cyprinid found in Mekong river basins in Thailand, Laos, Cambodia and Viet Nam.

References

Fish described in 1881
Esomus